Seth Lloyd (born August 2, 1960) is a professor of mechanical engineering and physics at the Massachusetts Institute of Technology.

His research area is the interplay of information with complex systems, especially quantum systems. He has performed seminal work in the fields of quantum computation, quantum communication and quantum biology, including proposing the first technologically feasible design for a quantum computer, demonstrating the viability of quantum analog computation, proving quantum analogs of Shannon's noisy channel theorem, and designing novel methods for quantum error correction and noise reduction.

Biography
Lloyd was born on August 2, 1960.  He graduated from Phillips Academy in 1978 and received a bachelor of arts degree from Harvard College in 1982. He earned a certificate of advanced study in mathematics and a master of philosophy degree from Cambridge University in 1983 and 1984, while on a Marshall Scholarship. Lloyd was awarded a doctorate by Rockefeller University in 1988 (advisor Heinz Pagels) after submitting a thesis on Black Holes, Demons, and the Loss of Coherence: How Complex Systems Get Information, and What They Do With It.

From 1988 to 1991, Lloyd was a postdoctoral fellow in the High Energy Physics Department at the California Institute of Technology, where he worked with Murray Gell-Mann on applications of information to quantum-mechanical systems. From 1991 to 1994, he was a postdoctoral fellow at Los Alamos National Laboratory, where he worked at the Center for Nonlinear Systems on quantum computation. In 1994, he joined the faculty of the Department of Mechanical Engineering at MIT. Starting in 1988, Lloyd was an external faculty member at the Santa Fe Institute for more than 30 years.

In his 2006 book, Programming the Universe, Lloyd contends that the universe itself is one big quantum computer producing what we see around us, and ourselves, as it runs a cosmic program. According to Lloyd, once we understand the laws of physics completely, we will be able to use small-scale quantum computing to understand the universe completely as well.

Lloyd states that we could have the whole universe simulated in a computer in 600 years provided that computational power increases according to Moore's Law.  However, Lloyd shows that there are limits to rapid exponential growth in a finite universe, and that it is very unlikely that Moore's Law will be maintained indefinitely.

Lloyd is principal investigator at the MIT Research Laboratory of Electronics, and directs the Center for Extreme Quantum Information Theory (xQIT) at MIT. His most recent work has focused on the role of quantum phenomena such as coherence in biological phenomena, especially photosynthesis. He has also collaborated in work to exploit these phenomena technologically.

Epstein affair
During July 2019, reports surfaced that MIT and other institutions had accepted funding from convicted sex offender Jeffrey Epstein. In the ensuing scandal, the director of the MIT Media Lab, Joi Ito, resigned from MIT as a result of his association with Epstein. Lloyd's connections to Epstein also drew criticism: Lloyd had acknowledged receiving funding from Epstein in 19 of his papers. On August 22, 2019, Lloyd published a letter apologizing for accepting grants (totaling $225,000) from Epstein. Despite this, the controversy continued.  In January 2020, at the request of the MIT Corporation, the law firm Goodwin Procter issued a report on all of MIT's interactions with Epstein. As a result of the report, on January 10, 2020, Lloyd was placed on paid administrative leave.  Lloyd has vigorously denied that he misled MIT about the source of the funds he received from Epstein. This denial was validated by a subsequent MIT investigation that concluded that Lloyd did not attempt to circumvent the MIT vetting process, nor try to conceal the name of the donor, and Lloyd was allowed to continue his tenured faculty position at MIT. However, most but not all members of MIT's fact-finding committee concluded that Lloyd had violated MIT's conflict of interest policy by not revealing crucial publicly known information about Epstein's background to MIT, as a result of which Lloyd will be subject to a series of administrative actions for 5 years.

Honors
 2007 Fellow of the American Physical Society
 2012 International Quantum Communication Award

Works

 Lloyd, S., Programming the Universe: A Quantum Computer Scientist Takes On the Cosmos, Knopf, March 14, 2006, 240 p., 
 Interview: Quantum Hanky Panky:  A Conversation with Seth Lloyd (video), Edge Foundation, 2016
 Interview: The Computational Universe: Seth Lloyd (video), Edge Foundation, 2002
 Lecture: The Black Hole of Finance (video), Santa Fe Institute

See also
 Digital physics
 Nuclear magnetic resonance quantum computer
 Quantum Aspects of Life
 Simulated reality

Notes

External links

Google Scholar page
Personal web page
"Crazy Molecules: Pulse Berlin Interview"
Programming the Universe
Radio Interview from This Week in Science September 26, 2006 Broadcast

American mechanical engineers
Complex systems scientists
Harvard College alumni
Rockefeller University alumni
MIT School of Engineering faculty
Living people
1960 births
American people of Welsh descent
Santa Fe Institute people
New England Complex Systems Institute
Quantum information scientists
Quantum biology
Marshall Scholars
Fellows of the American Physical Society